Putten is a municipality in the province of Gelderland, Netherlands.

It can also refer to:

Putten, a neighborhood in Eindhoven, Netherlands
Putten Island, former island now part of Voorne-Putten, an island in South Holland, Netherlands
Dutch surnames:
Van Putten
Van der Putten

See also
Putte (disambiguation)